This can mean more than one place in South Africa:
Groenvlei, KwaZulu-Natal
Groenvlei, Western Cape